Bushido is a Samurai role-playing game set in Feudal Japan, originally designed by Robert N. Charrette and Paul R. Hume and published originally by Tyr Games, then Phoenix Games, and subsequently by Fantasy Games Unlimited. The setting for the game is a land called Nippon, and characters adventure in this heroic, mythic, and fantastic analogue of Japan's past.

It is thematically based on Chanbara movies, such as those made by Akira Kurosawa, in which the heroes are modestly superhuman but not extraordinarily so.

Overview 

The Bushido role-playing game was originally published in 1979 by Tyr Games (which quickly went out of business) but was more widely released in 1980 by Phoenix Games as a boxed set.  This edition included a map of Nippon, a tri-fold screen, a character sheet, Book I, The Heroes of Nippon, the Players Guidebook and Book II, The Land of Nippon, the Gamesmaster's Guidebook. All illustrations in the original boxed set are copyright by Robert N. Charrette. The game is now sold as a single book in which the two original books are combined (otherwise unaltered).

Bushido players define characters with a series of attributes, skills, professions, and levels. The professions are Bushi (fighters), Budoka (martial artists), Yakuza (gangsters), Ninja, Shugenja (Taoist-style wizards) and Gakusho (priests, either Buddhist or Shinto). Character progression is implemented by both down-time training and level advancement. There are only six character levels.

Social aspects are important in the game. Each character is randomly assigned at birth to a class in the strict feudal hierarchy of Nippon - Samurai, various commoner classes, and Eta. For level advancement, honourable behaviour and loyal service to the character's social group (the local lord, the ninja clan, the temple, the gang, etc.) are as important as defeating enemies in battle.

The Bushido system is dice-based, most important rolls being made with a twenty-sided (d20) die. The gamemaster can use the various social obligations of the characters to create dilemmas which cannot necessarily be overcome by violence.

Shugenja and Gakusho can use magic. At the discretion of the gamemaster, supernatural monsters may feature in the game.

Reception
Bushido received mixed reviews.

In the June–July 1979 edition of Different Worlds (Issue 3), Stephen L. Lortz found the rules "well written and logically ordered." He also liked the introduction of "On points", noting that it "placed Bushido outside of the 'kill and pillage' category of RPGs [...] On encourages players to steer their characters into social and political, as well as combat situations, and does much to generate the authentic flavour of the game." He concluded, "I highly recommend Bushido to people who are interested in running a fantasy campaign based primarily on the Japanese mythos and to people who are interested in the art of RPG design."

In the February 1980 edition of Dragon (Issue 34), D. Okada was disappointed by "a horrendous amount of typographical errors in the rules... There are times when they do hamper understanding of what is supposed to be going on." Okada also noted a lack of detailed background on medieval Japan, and concluded with a guarded recommendation: "Despite these faults, the game is worth the price to the person interested in developing a more cosmopolitan outlook."
 
In the July 1980 edition of The Space Gamer (Issue No. 29), Forrest Johnson was unimpressed, saying, "Karate fans and samurai fans may dig this one. Serious students will just have to wait for something better."

In the March 1981 edition of Ares (Issue 7), Eric Goldberg found fault with the character generation system that determines certain aspects randomly, but then uses a point-buy system to allow a player to optimize the character. "There is a logical argument for both methods — even in conjunction — but one's purpose defeats the other." Goldberg liked the code of honor in the game, which he felt "distinguishes Bushido from most other role-playing games." But he felt that otherwise, Bushido was "unremarkable", and gave a half-hearted recommendation: "Bushido is a nice enough meld of a surrealistic and D&D-style flavor, and has a game system sturdy enough to support this impression."

In the August 1982 edition of White Dwarf Magazine (Issue #32), Mike Polling rated Bushido 10 out of 10, saying that it was "maybe the best game I have ever seen... The game system is one of the most intelligent and carefully thought out I have ever seen."

In the January–February 1985 edition of Different Worlds (Issue #38), Scott Dillinger gave it an average rating of 3 stars out of 4, saying, "Professionalism is reflected in all aspects of Bushido and the research and design of this system combines to give players an opportunity to learn about, and to experience this fascinating culture and still have fun doing it. In this industry that's all one can ask for."

In April 1985, Imagine dedicated Issue #25 to Japanese and "far east" role-playing. Bushido was praised by Mike Brunton for focusing on "non-adventuring skills", indicating how it was different than the current version of Advanced Dungeons & Dragons.

In the pages of his 1987 book, Role-Playing Mastery, Dungeons & Dragons co-creator E. Gary Gygax mentioned Bushido in his short list of notable RPGs.

In the June 1988 edition of Dragon (Issue 134), Jim Bambra compared the various role-playing game systems set in Japan, and found Bushido to be very complex. "It is a game for dedicated gamers who, in their pursuit of Oriental action, are willing to struggle with rule books that make advanced nuclear theory texts seem like light reading by comparison." Bambra found the biggest issue to be the badly organized rules. "A revamping and reordering of this material would go a long way to making the game more accessible. Compared to more recent games, the Bushido game is a work of enthusiasm, with little or no thought given to presentation or ease of use." Bambra also found the character generation system to be "difficult and involved", and the game's mechanics to "work fairly well but are convoluted in places." Bambra also pointed out that in the decade since Bushido had been published, only two adventure-supplements had been published, leaving all the work of creating an adventure to each gamemaster. Bambra concluded that newer games systems provided better ease of use. "If you’re looking for a stand-alone system, then check out the Bushido game. But if accessibility and ease of use are your primary requirements, stay well away. The two other supplements under review this month [Runequest: Land of Ninja and Oriental Adventures] are superior models of presentation, and they build upon tried and tested systems. The Bushido game is for those who like complication for complication's sake."

In the June 1989 edition of Games International (Issue 6), Ian Marsh was impressed by how much of the social, spiritual and cultural was highlighted, saying, "Bushido developed the idea that a game should be more than a rules system by making culture a strong element in play." But Marsh noted that subsequently, "its attractions to mainstream roleplayers are limited." He also noted the lack of published adventures, commenting, "anyone who buys Bushido has to develop their own scenarios, making the game less appealing to referees who have little enough time to run games as it is." He concluded by giving this game an above average rating of 4 out of 5, saying, "It's a cult game, and nothing's going to change that [...] which is a shame for Bushido genuinely presents a role-playing challenge."

Steve Faragher did a retrospective review of Bushido for the May 1996 edition of Arcane, stating that "Politics and action went hand in hand with Bushido and the game had an innately epic scale."

In a 1996 reader poll in Arcane magazine, Bushido was ranked 17th of the 50 most popular roleplaying games of all time. Editor Paul Pettengale commented: "Those of us who have had the pleasure of playing Bushido over an extended period of time have noticed that this is a game which lends itself far more towards campaign play than one-off scenarios. Consequently, it takes a lot of effort and dedication on the part of the players and referee alike to play through, and even more effort to run successfully. Nevertheless, the effort is rewarded with fun, albeit a somewhat reserved, thoughtful kind of fun, rather than the more gung-ho kind of action you would usually expect from the likes of AD&D."

Other reviews
 Casus Belli #15 (June 1983)
Shadis #29 (1996) 
 Casus Belli #35 (Dec 1986)

Supplements published for Bushido

 Valley of the Mists by Robert N. Charrette, published by Fantasy Games Unlimited
 Takishido's Debt by Steve Bell, published by Fantasy Games Unlimited
 Honor Bound by Stephen Dedman, published by Fantasy Games Unlimited
 A Tale of Honor Lost by Jeffrey A. O'Hare, published by Fantasy Games Unlimited
 Ninja - Shadows Over Nippon, never released
 Adventures in White Dwarf #47 (Kwaidan by Oliver Johnson and Dave Morris)
 Articles in White Dwarf #57 (Ninjas), #85 (Entertainers)

Other East Asian-themed role-playing games
 Land of the Rising Sun: a heavily modified version of Chivalry & Sorcery written by Lee Gold and published in 1980 by Fantasy Games Unlimited
 Oriental Adventures: a supplement for the Advanced Dungeons & Dragons role-playing game, produced in 1985 by Gary Gygax's TSR, Inc.
 Land of Ninja: published simultaneously in 1987 in the USA by Avalon Hill and in the UK by Games Workshop (but each edition having its own cover art) Land of Ninja was a supplement for the third edition of RuneQuest, but set in a both mythological and historical Japan.
 Legend of the Five Rings: a role-playing game and accompanying collectible card game, produced in 1995 by Alderac Entertainment Group.
 Sengoku: produced in 1999 by Gold Rush Games.
 Oriental Adventures (third edition): produced in 2001 by Wizards of the Coast.
 Ruins and Ronin: Produced by Mike Davison, a Medieval/Fantasy themed role-playing game set in a Japanese cultural setting.

References

External links
 The current Fantasy Games Unlimited website

Historical role-playing games
Role-playing games introduced in 1979
Fantasy Games Unlimited games
Martial arts role-playing games
Fantasy role-playing games